The International Society of Psychiatric Genetics (ISPG) is a learned society that aims to "promote and facilitate research in the genetics of psychiatric disorders, substance use disorders and allied traits". To this end, among other things, it organizes an annual "World Congress of Psychiatric Genetics".

It also awards each year the "Ming Tsuang Lifetime Achievement Award" for scientists who have made major contributions to the field of psychiatric genetics and the "Theodore Reich Young Investigator Award" for work of exceptional merit by researchers under 40 years of age.

Presidents
The following people have been president of the society:
1992–1996: Theodore Reich
1996–2000: Peter McGuffin
2000–2005: Mike Owen
2005–2010: Ming Tsuang
2010–2012: Nick Craddock
2012–2016: Francis J. McMahon
2016–present: Thomas G. Schulze

Ming Tsuang Lifetime Achievement Award
The annual Ming Tsuang Lifetime Achievement Award is given to a distinguished senior scientist who has made significant and sustained contributions to the advancement of the field of psychiatric genetics. It is named for Ming Tsuang, who was the recipient of the award in 1995. The following persons have received this award:

References

External links
 

Organizations established in 1992
International scientific organizations
Psychiatry organizations
Behavioural genetics societies